The Lancer 45 is an American sailboat that was designed by Herb David as a  motorsailer and first built in 1981.

Production
The design was built by Lancer Yachts in the United States, between 1981 and 1985, but it is now out of production.

Design
The Lancer 45 is a recreational keelboat, built predominantly of fiberglass, with wood trim. It has a masthead sloop rig, a sharply raked stem, an angled transom with a fixed swimming platform, a skeg-mounted rudder controlled by a wheel, a center cockpit with an optional wheelhouse and a fixed fin keel. It displaces  and carries  of ballast.

The boat is fitted with an inboard diesel engine for cruising, docking and maneuvering.

The design has sleeping accommodation for six people, with a double berth in the bow cabin, a double berth in a forward cabin behind the bow cabin on the port side and a large aft cabin with a centered double berth. The galley is located on the port side aft of the companionway ladder. The galley is equipped with a two-burner stove and a double sink. A navigation station is opposite the galley, on the starboard side. There are two heads, one just aft of the bow cabin on the starboard side and one on the starboard side forward of the aft cabin.

See also
List of sailing boat types

References

External links
Photo of a Lancer 45 showing the bow
Photo of a Lancer 45 showing the transom

Keelboats
Motorsailers
1980s sailboat type designs
Sailing yachts
Sailboat type designs by Herb David
Sailboat types built by Lancer Yachts